Louis Broyles "Pete" Crayton Sr. (November 27, 1894 – April 1958) was an American football coach and businessman. He served as the head football coach at his alma mater, Davidson College, for a single season in 1919, compiling a record of 4–6–1. He took time away from his business ventures to accept the coaching position on short notice.

Head coaching record

References

External links
 

1894 births
1958 deaths
Davidson Wildcats football coaches
Davidson College alumni
People from Anderson, South Carolina